Selishte is a village in Blagoevgrad Municipality, in Blagoevgrad Province, Bulgaria. It is situated 11 kilometers west of Blagoevgrad on the road to Delčevo in North Macedonia.

References

Villages in Blagoevgrad Province